The Minister for European Union Affairs is a cabinet minister who is part of the Swedish Government and appointed by the Prime Minister. The minister is directly under the Prime Minister's Office and is responsible for overall questions about the European Union, such as the strategy for growth and employment, the financial perspective, the Lisbon Treaty and the anchoring of EU membership.

The office was abolished on two occasion, between 1996 and 2005, and then in 2014–2016. On 18 October 2022, Jessika Roswall was appointed Minister for European Union Affairs.

List of Ministers for European Union Affairs 

|-
! colspan=9 | Abolished 1996–2005

|-
! colspan=9 | Abolished 2014–2016

External links
 

Government ministers of Sweden